Aurora (Jeanne-Marie Beaubier) is a superhero appearing in American comic books published by Marvel Comics. Created by Chris Claremont and John Byrne, the character first appeared in The Uncanny X-Men #120 (April 1979). Aurora is a member of the Canadian superhero team, Alpha Flight.

Aurora is the twin sister of Northstar and the former lover of Sasquatch and Wild Child. The character struggled with a dissociative identity disorder for years leading to two distinctive personalities: the quiet, religious Jeanne-Marie and the outgoing, heroic, uninhibited Aurora. Aurora and Northstar worked together for years as part of Alpha Flight, including dealing with Beaubier's struggles with her personality disorders. She was briefly a member of the X-Men and also participated in the Weapon X program in an attempt to gain control of her splintered personalities.

During the Chaos War storyline, Aurora, alongside Northstar, Sasquatch, and Snowbird are reunited with a resurrected Guardian, Vindicator, Shaman, and Marrina, reforming Alpha Flight.

Publication history

Aurora first appeared in The Uncanny X-Men #120 as a member of Alpha Flight, and was created by Chris Claremont and John Byrne.

Fictional character biography
Jeanne-Marie Beaubier was born in Montreal, Quebec, Canada. She and her twin brother Jean-Paul were separated in infancy after their parents died. Jean-Paul was adopted by Mr. and Mrs. Louis Martin, who were cousins of his mother. The Martins could not afford to adopt Jeanne-Marie as well and arranged for Jeanne-Marie to be raised at Madame DuPont's School for Girls in Laval, Quebec, a reactionary religious school. Soon afterward, the Martins moved to Northern Quebec. The Martins were killed in an accident several years later and Jean-Paul was placed in a foster home, unaware that he had a sister.

Extremely nervous and introverted, Jeanne-Marie Beaubier was miserable at Madame DuPont's School. At the age of thirteen, she attempted suicide by throwing herself from the roof of one of the school's buildings. Instead of falling to her death, Beaubier discovered that she could fly at great speed. Unaware that she was a mutant, the deeply religious Beaubier believed that her flight was the result of a divine miracle. The next morning, she explained to the school's headmistress what she believed had happened. Believing the young girl to be guilty of blasphemy, the headmistress had Beaubier severely disciplined. This incident (and possibly other abuse) triggered a dissociative identity disorder in Jeanne-Marie; a second personality, extroverted and far more uninhibited, emerged. Under the influence of this second personality, Beaubier secretly left the school that same night. Returning three days later, she had no memory of where she had been or what she had done and she was again physically punished. The resulting trauma was so great that Beaubier repressed her second personality.

Alpha Flight
Five years later, Beaubier's application to become a teacher of history and geography at the school was accepted. By this time, Beaubier had adjusted to life at the school and her everyday personality was that of a prim, proper, repressed woman. The same night that her application was accepted, her second personality re-emerged and she left to enjoy herself in Montreal. Confronted by muggers, she knocked one unconscious by moving at superhuman speed (this was the first time that she had used her superhuman powers in five years). The second mugger was halted by Wolverine, who had witnessed the attempted assault. Recognizing that Beaubier had superhuman powers, Wolverine invited her to go to Ottawa to meet James MacDonald Hudson, who was organizing a team of superhumanly powerful agents for the Canadian government's Department H. Hudson accepted her as a recruit and reunited her with her brother. After a period of training, both Beaubier siblings joined the team that Hudson created, Alpha Flight, under the code names Aurora and Northstar.

On Alpha Flight's first mission, Aurora aided in combating the X-Men to capture Wolverine.  With Northstar, she battled Deadly Ernest. She later recounted how she developed her superhuman powers and developed her Aurora personality, and how Wolverine recruited her into Alpha Flight, as well as how she met Northstar. Aurora later had a falling out with her brother, and upon her wish to separate herself from her brother, her powers were altered by Walter Langowski. Aurora was captured by Gilded Lily, but was rescued by Sasquatch, who began to suspect that she was manifesting a third personality.  With Northstar, she battled Pink Pearl.

She was later temporarily cured of her multiple personalities. Alongside the X-Men and Alpha Flight, she battled Loki. She was again attacked by Gilded Lily.  Aurora was captured by Box, who had gone insane, but was later rescued by Alpha Flight. Loki deceived Aurora into believing that her mother had been an Asgardian Light Elf.  The team brought her and Northstar to the place where they once encountered a magical Firefountain; they wanted to heal her mind and Northstar's body. During a battle with dark elves, she cured her brother by giving him all of her light. She was carried off by the elves, but Loki (in an attempt to curry favor with Those Who Sit Above In Shadow) transported her to a convent for safety, who took her in.

Talisman later came to Jeanne-Marie at the convent and transported her to Asgard along with Persuasion, Goblyn and Laura Dean to help rescue Northstar in Alfheim. He had gone to Asgard to explore their half-elf heritage, only to discover that Loki lied about it. Northstar had been trapped on Asgard for months. In battle, Northstar shared the light with Aurora and restored her powers. After their battle with the sorcerer LLan, she rejoined Alpha Flight. Aurora soon discovered that she could now generate a light that bestowed inner peace in others. With Alpha Flight and the Fantastic Four, she fought against Headlok.  Headlok mentally manipulated her, causing her to revert to her original split personality, and she then killed Headlok. She soon thereafter had a rematch with Pink Pearl.  Eventually, the original incarnation of Alpha Flight disbanded.

Resurfacing and rehabilitation
In the events leading up her reappearance in Weapon X vol. 2, Aurora's mental health continues to deteriorate and she is later turned into a mind controlled agent of Weapon X. She also engages in an abusive relationship with the Weapon X director, Malcolm Colcord, who frequently beat her. Aurora manages to retaliate against her mind-control by creating a third personality that was unaffected by her situation. She attacks Colcord and manages to escape. In her next appearance, Aurora's mental state becomes unstable to the point that all her personalities agree that suicide is the best solution. However, she is stopped by the arrival of Northstar, who is under the control of the Children of the Vault, a mysterious group of newly emerged superhumans who seek to destroy mutants, viewing them to be their competition for dominance of the planet. One of the Children, Serafina, places the twins under their control, largely repairing Aurora's fragile psyche, boosting the twins' powers and altering them so that they can generate not only light when in contact with each other, but heat as well.

The twins are sent on a mission to attack the X-Men and retrieve Sabretooth for the Children of the Vault. The twins are able to defeat several of the X-Men and New X-Men until Mystique is able to exploit Aurora's shattered psyche by taking on her image. Iceman manages to incapacitate Aurora while Cable subdues Northstar.

The X-Men take Northstar and Aurora to the S.H.I.E.L.D. Helicarrier in an attempt to fix the mental damage inflicted on the twins. Using their virtual reality equipment the X-Men allowed the twins to relive their lives at an accelerated pace. The process was interrupted near the end of the session by Exodus, creating a telepathic connection between the twins. Using each other's emotional support, they manage to face their inner personal turmoils and regain control of their minds.  Aurora and Northstar also gain a higher level of control over their powers, which they use to save Rogue from the Acolyte known as Frenzy. They later reappear in the mini-crossover series Secret Invasion: X-Men, joining the X-Men when the Skrull invasion reaches San Francisco.

Aurora next appears in Uncanny X-Men, having formed a snowsporting company with Northstar, Team Northstar Extreme Snowsports. Aurora appears to be living a relatively normal life since regaining control of her mind, working as the joint CEO of the company. She is contacted by Wolverine when he wishes to extend an invitation to Northstar to join X-Men on Utopia.

During one of Aurora's therapy sessions to deal with her disorder, she is given a device to wear on her head for tests, when in actuality, her therapist was bribed by Norman Osborn to use it on her so he could speak with her more dark and violent personality about joining his Dark X-Men. Jeanne-Marie, though, does not care to take orders from anyone, least of all someone who is just as broken as herself, and goes to leave, before he turns the device on her again, saying he does not take no for an answer. However, Aurora brings up another personality to combat the guards, and brings up more for each time the device is used on her, before she is able to turn it on Osborn himself and walk away.

During the Chaos War storyline, Aurora alongside Northstar, Sasquatch, and Snowbird are reunited with a resurrected Guardian, Vindicator, Shaman, and Marrina Smallwood.

As part of the All-New, All-Different Marvel event, Aurora appears as a member of the Alpha Flight space program.

Dawn of X
As part of Dawn of X Aurora was one of the many mutants that joined the mutant nation of Krakoa. Aurora and her brother Northstar were later sent on a flyover scouting mission to investigate a strange island that mysteriously appeared off the southern coast of Krakoa. In their report they mentioned the island being full of giant hostile beasts.

Some time later, Northstar strangely felt his connection to his sister evaporate. He immediately heads to the hatchery to try and get Aurora resurrected but unfortunately he needs proof of death to start the reincarnation process. Northstar then seeks to find out where his sister could have gone. He enters the Green Lagoon Tiki Bar to see what the bartender may know but ultimately runs into Polaris. Polaris suggests they form an investigative team to head to Vancouver where she was last seen. They recruit the repowered Prodigy, Prestige, Eye-boy and Daken. Using Aurora's social media, they are able to discover she had been into a motel where she seemed to had a rendezvous with a man. She then got into a car and drove off a side of the road. Using Eye-boy's powers, they are able to find the car and the body. They then present the case to the Quiet Council. It seems that the man who Aurora was meeting set up a trap for her that caused her car to be thrown off the side of the bridge. After figuring out the cause of death, the Five decide to bring this group together under Northstar to form X-Factor.

Powers and abilities

Aurora has the powers of flight and superhuman speed and reflexes (theoretically able to approach light-speed. This has never been attempted since if any being or amount of matter were to approach the speed of light in our solar system, it would wreak devastating havoc on the gravitational forces holding our system together). The greater her increase in speed, the more durable her body becomes, but this ability has not been measured.

She also has super-human levels of endurance and stamina that allows her to maintain her super-speed. In an early issue of Alpha Flight, Northstar reveals to readers that Aurora has greater endurance and can fly longer, while he can fly faster in the same period of time. Her strength and reaction time are above-average for a woman of her age and exercise level, however, Aurora usually does not rely on her physical strength while battling opponents and, instead, uses super-speed tricks, like flying with someone at great speed until they pass out from lack of oxygen or pummeling them with hundreds of punches a second until they succumb. Aurora also uses her super speed to perform stunts such as creating a cyclone by running in circles, running up walls and across water, and she could breathe while traveling at subsonic speeds.

Originally, while in physical contact with her brother, usually while holding hands, the pair could emit bursts of brilliant white light with an average flash equal in intensity of one million candela (one candela being equal to the amount of light created by one candle). It was generally used to blind their opponents, but with the minor drawback that they were not able to control its intensity. Experiments performed on Aurora by Walter Langowski enabled her to generate light independently from Northstar, but a side effect of this was that physical contact between the two would temporarily neutralize both of their powers. Her speed was also greatly reduced to only being able to move and fly at the speed of sound. However, with Aurora's recent resurrection in a new body, these modifications are now gone, enabling them to generate light together again and restoring her previous levels of speed.

Aurora is moderately skilled in hand-to-hand combat using a style utilizing her superhuman speed, and received coaching from Puck and Wolverine.

Reception

Critical reception 
Screen Rant ranked Aurora 2nd in their "10 Fastest X-Men In Marvel Comics" list, and 8th in their "12 Fastest Superheroes Of All Time" list. Rohan Pendurkar of Sportskeeda ranked Aurora 3rd in their "5 fastest characters in comic history" list. CBR.com ranked Aurora 9th in their "Marvel: The 20 Fastest Speedsters" list, 9th in their "10 Most Powerful Members of Canada’s Avengers" list, and 19th in their "25 Fastest Characters In The Marvel Universe" list.

Other versions

Age of Apocalypse
In the Age of Apocalypse reality, Northstar and Aurora were part of Mister Sinister's Elite Mutant Force (E.M.F.) and, as such, were assigned to patrolling the breeding pens. The siblings fully embraced their beliefs of mutant superiority and seemed to take great pleasure in punishing those prisoners who acted up or tried to escape.  When the E.M.F.'s leader, Cyclops, switched sides, secretly helping some inmates to escape, he was caught in the act by the speeding twins.  However, both of them were defeated by Cyclops and the prisoner he was helping to escape, which happened to be Polaris. When the series was revisited for the 10 year anniversary, it was revealed that following the fall of Apocalypse's regime, the Beaubiers became fugitives until they were killed by Weapon X and Kirika.

Marvel Zombies
In the Marvel Zombies comics set in the universe of Earth-2149, the zombified Alpha Flight attack the X-Men and are eventually killed by Magneto. Aurora is seen in a panel of Marvel Zombies Dead Days attacking the X-Man Storm alongside her brother Northstar. The two are killed by Magneto only moments later.

Weapon X: Days of Future Now
In the Weapon X: Days of Future Now storyline, Aurora is one of the mutants that Wolverine recruits in order to resurrect the X-Men after all except himself and Angel were killed by Weapon X under Malcolm Colcord. She joins Wolverine's new, more violent X-Men along with Juggernaut, Deadpool, Mystique, Sunfire, Archangel, and Agent Zero.

She is killed along with Mystique, Sunfire, and Deadpool, when it is revealed that Agent Zero has been made into a sleeper agent for Weapon X through the use of Mesmero's mutant hypnotic abilities. He ambushes his teammates in their base, killing or severely wounding them with gunfire and his concussive energy blasts. Eventually, he takes his own life when he manages to break free of Weapon X's control, moments before killing Wolverine.

Earth X
In Earth X, Aurora is still a member of Alpha Flight. However, she was killed alongside her team by the Tong of Creel.

What If?
In What If? Cyclops and Jean Gray Had Married Sooner, Professor X recruited Aurora as part of a new team of X-Men when his originals all left his teaching years earlier than expected. She, Northstar, Catseye, Colossus and Storm trained briefly before they and the professor were all killed fighting Krakoa the living island. The Avengers stopped Krakoa, and when they blew it apart, they discovered the X-Men's bodies.

X-Men: The End
In the X-Men: The End universe, Aurora's image appears as a spirit to her brother.

House of M
In the House of M reality, a woman similar to Aurora is seen with Northstar who is an agent of S.H.I.E.L.D, responsible for training a squad of young mutants and superhumans in the agency's junior training squad program. However, she is only seen briefly.

Ultimate Marvel
An Ultimate version of Aurora makes her debut in Ultimate X-Men #94 as part of Alpha Flight. Like her mainstream counterpart, she is the sister of Northstar. The two seem to share a distant relationship, because Aurora still works for Department H, somewhere that Jean-Paul ran from claiming they were crazy. She is the one who physically takes her brother captive. Her power seemed to be speed based, but, according to her and due to being enhanced by the Mutant Growth Hormone known as Banshee, she is faster than light; something which she proved by being able to remove Colossus' grip on their jet without him being aware of it. Later, when the X-Men attack their base to rescue Northstar, she is quickly taken down by Dazzler, who has also enhanced her abilities with Banshee.

Age of X
In the Age of X reality, the deceased Aurora is the motivation of her brother's attempts to kill Kitty Pryde.

In other media

Television
 Aurora appears in the X-Men animated series episodes "Slave Island" and "Repo Man."

Video games 

 Aurora appears in Marvel Puzzle Quest.

References

External links
 Aurora at Marvel.com
 AlphaFlight.Net Alphanex Entry on - Aurora
 Uncannyxmen.net Spotlight On...Aurora

Canadian superheroes
Characters created by Chris Claremont
Characters created by John Byrne (comics)
Comics characters introduced in 1979
Fictional characters from Montreal
Fictional characters who can manipulate light
Fictional characters with dissociative identity disorder
Fictional Christian nuns
Fictional female secret agents and spies
Fictional schoolteachers
Marvel Comics characters who can move at superhuman speeds
Marvel Comics female superheroes
Marvel Comics martial artists
Marvel Comics mutants
Marvel Comics orphans
Superheroes who are adopted
Twin characters in comics
X-Men supporting characters